Pachat'aqa (other spellings Pachataca, Pachataka), possibly erroneously also named Horca del Inca in Spanish, is an archaeological site in Bolivia situated near Lake Titicaca. It lies in the La Paz Department, Manco Kapac Province, Copacabana Municipality, near Copacabana.

See also 
 Chinkana
 Iñaq Uyu

References 

Archaeological sites in Bolivia
Buildings and structures in La Paz Department (Bolivia)
Tourist attractions in La Paz Department (Bolivia)